Sherry Jueyu Wu (Park) is an Assistant Professor of Management and Organizational Behavior at the University of California, Los Angeles (UCLA) Anderson School of Management. in Westwood, California and the 2020 recipient of the Cialdini Prize from the Society for Personality and Social Psychology (SPSP) for her field research in group dynamics and authority. She conducts large-scale field experiments concerning group influence over long-lasting behavioral changes and decision processes under resource disparity and social inequality.

Education and career 
Wu received her Bachelor of Arts degrees in Psychology and Economics graduating summa cum laude from the University of Virginia in May 2013. She then went on to Graduate Studies in Social Psychology and Social Policy at Princeton University under the mentorship of Betsy Levy Paluck and Eldar Shafir, earning her Ph.D. in June 2019. Currently, Wu has been an Assistant Professor at the UCLA Anderson School of Management since July 2019, instructing primarily MBA students in Leadership Foundations and Organizational Behavior Management.

Personal 
Wu is originally from Suzhou, China and graduated from the Jiangsu four-starred Suzhou High School. She is currently residing with her husband in Sherman Oaks, Los Angeles.

Wu is fluent in Mandarin Chinese, Wu Chinese, and English.

References 

Living people
University of California, Los Angeles faculty
University of Virginia alumni
Princeton University alumni
21st-century American psychologists
Year of birth missing (living people)
Chinese psychologists